Deephole is an unincorporated community located in Lawrence County, Kentucky, United States.

References

Unincorporated communities in Lawrence County, Kentucky
Unincorporated communities in Kentucky